The Hiawatha is an American paddlewheel river boat. The vessel has a maximum capacity of 120 (117 passengers and 3 crew).

Title
It was named after another paddlewheel riverboat that was destroyed during the spring ice thaw in 1914. That boat was named after an Iroquois Indian chief named Hiawatha who was instrumental in bringing together the Five Nations of the Iroquois Confederacy and lived in Pre-Columbian America.

Route
The vessel is routed in the West Branch Susquehanna River from Williamsport (origin), upstream through Woodward Township, Susquehanna Township to Linden (turn around point) back down stream. This is the usual routing however some cruises can be lengthened, some cruise are known to go as far upstream as Piatt Township when water levels are viable.

The Hiawatha cannot go downstream past Williamsport due to the Williamsport Dam located near the border to Loyalsock Township.

References

External links
 Official website

1981 ships
River cruise ships
Passenger ships of the United States